Michael Clarke is a British academic who specialises in defence studies. He was Director of the Royal United Services Institute from 2007 to 2015. During the 2022 Russian invasion of Ukraine, he served as Sky News' security and defence analyst.

Biography

A graduate of Aberystwyth University, Clarke is a former Deputy Vice-principal and Director of Research Development at King's College London, where he remains a Visiting Professor of Defence Studies.

Between 1990 and 2001, Clarke was the Director of the Centre for Defence Studies. From 2001 to 2005, he was the Director of the International Policy Institute. In 2004 and 2005 he was Head of the School of Social Science and Public Policy at King's College London, where he had been a Professor of Defence Studies since 1995.

Books
The Challenge of Defending Britain (2019)
Tipping Point: Britain, Brexit and Security in the 2020s (2019)
Britain’s Persuaders: Soft Power in a Hard World (2021)

References

1950 births
Living people
Alumni of Aberystwyth University
Academics of King's College London
Fellows of King's College London
British military writers
People from Wallasey